Dendrophidion paucicarinatum, commonly known as Cope's forest racer, is a snake of the colubrid family.

Geographic distribution
The snake is found in Costa Rica and western Panama between altitudes of 1000 and 1600 meters.

References

Colubrids
Snakes of Central America
Reptiles of Panama
Reptiles of Costa Rica
Reptiles described in 1894